Helluo is a genus of beetles in the family Carabidae, containing the following species:

 Helluo costatus Bonelli, 1813
 Helluo insignis Sloane, 1890

References

Anthiinae (beetle)